The Slavic ethnonym (and autonym), Slavs, is reconstructed in Proto-Slavic as *Slověninъ, plural Slověně. The earliest written references to the Slav ethnonym are in other languages.

Early mentions 
Possibly the oldest mention of Slavs in almost historical form *Slověne is attested in Ptolemy's Geography (2nd century) as Σταυανοί (Stavanoi) and Σουοβηνοί (Souobenoi/Sovobenoi, Suobeni, Suoweni), both listed as Scythian tribes living near Alanians north of Scythia (first roughly between Volga and Ural Mountains, second between the Baltic Sea and Black Sea). Zbigniew Gołąb accepted Pavel Jozef Šafárik's opinion that Greeks inserted "τ" or "θ" for Slavic "sl-" (reconstructing Proto-Slavic *Slɔu̯ǣnæ), and "through the labialized articulation of the vowel /ɔ/ conditioned by the preceding /u̯/" in Proto-Slavic *Su̯ɔbǣnæ (*Svoběne).

Sporoi or Spori was according to Eastern Roman/Byzantine scholar Procopius (500–560) the old name of the Antes and Sclaveni, two Early Slavic branches. Procopius stated that the Sclaveni and Antes spoke the same language, but he traced their common origin back to not the Veneti (as per Jordanes) but a people that he called Sporoi. He derived the name from Greek  ("I scatter grain"), because "they populated the land with scattered settlements". He described their society as democratic, and their language as barbaric.

The Roman bureaucrat Jordanes wrote about the Slavs in his work Getica (551): "although they derive from one nation, now they are known under three names, the Veneti, Antes and Sclaveni"; that is, the West Slavs, East Slavs, and South Slavs. He stated that the Veneti were the ancestors of the Sclaveni and the Antes, the two having used to be called Veneti but are now "chiefly" (though, by implication, not exclusively) called Sclaveni and Antes. Jordanes' Veneti and Procopius' Sporoi were used for the ethnogenetic legend of the Slavs, the ancestors of the Slavs (the subsequent ethnic group name).

Thus, the Slav ethnonym at first denoted the southern group of the early Slavs. In Ancient Greek there are no words with the root sl-, thus the original ethnonym was transformed into skl-, as that root was present (in sklērós, "hard").

Church Slavonic manuscripts 
In East Church Slavonic manuscripts, the ethnonym is spelt Slověne, such as in the Primary Chronicle, Sofia First Chronicle, Novgorod First Chronicle and Novgorod Fourth Chronicle. In the source dating to 898 included in the Primary Chronicle, the term is used both for East Slavic tribes and more often for a people (in the Kievan Rus' society, alongside Varangians, Chuds and Kriviches).

Etymology 
The Slavic autonym *Slověninъ is usually considered a derivation from Proto-Slavic adjective svobъ ("oneself", "one's own"; derivative svoboda > sloboda also "freedom", "free settlement"), which derives from Indo-European *s(w)e/obh(o)- "a person or thing apart, separate", root *swobh "his/hers", meaning "all the members of an exogamic moiety > actual or potential affines/blood relatives". It can be interpreted as "a tribe of the free, of their own people". Names of many Germanic tribes derive from the same root, which was not an exonym but endonym.  Eventually with dissimilation of svobъ > slobъ was associated with slovo "word", originally denoting "people who speak (the same language)", i.e. people who understand each other, in contrast to the Slavic word denoting "foreign people", namely němci, meaning "mumbling, murmuring people" (from Slavic *němъ "mumbling, mute"). The latter word may be the derivation of words to denote "Germans" or "Germanic peoples" in many later Slavic languages, e. g., Czech Němec, Slovak Nemec, Slovene Nemec, Belarusian, Russian and Bulgarian Немец, Serbian Немац, Croatian Nijemac, Polish Niemiec, Ukrainian Німець, etc., but another theory states that rather these words are derived from the name of the Nemetes tribe, which is derived from the Celtic root nemeto-.

Alternative proposals for the etymology of *Slověninъ propounded by some scholars have much less support. B. Philip Lozinski argues that the word *slava once had the meaning of "worshipper", in this context "practicer of a common Slavic religion"; from that evolved into an ethnonym. S. B. Bernstein speculated that it derives from a reconstructed Proto-Indo-European , cognate to Ancient Greek λαός (laós) "population, people", which itself has no commonly accepted etymology. Meanwhile, others theorize that Slavyane is of toponymic origin, from a place named Slovo or a river named Slova; this, according to some, is implied by the suffix -enin. The Old East Slavic Slavuta for the Dnieper River was argued by Henrich Bartek (1907–1986) to be derived from slova and also the origin of Slověne.

According to the widespread view known since 18th century, the English word slave, which arrived in modern language from Middle English sclave, from Old French esclave, from Late Middle High German sklave, from Medieval Latin sclāvus, from Late Latin Sclāvus, from Byzantine Greek Σκλάβος [Sklábos],  [Ésklabḗnos] and displaced native Old English þēow, derives from Byzantine loanword from a Slavic gen self-name  -  [Sklábinoi],  [Ésklabēnoí], that turned into the meaning 'prisoner of war Slave', 'slave' (Late Latin ) in 8th/9th century, because they often became captured and enslaved (see also Saqaliba). Similarly the popular Italian-language (and international) salutation Ciao is also derived from that Slavic athnonym. However this version is disputed since 19th century.

Alternative contemporary hypothesis states that Medieval Latin  via secondary form  derives from Byzantine  [skūláō, skyláō],  [skūleúō, skyleúō] - "to strip the enemy (killed in a battle)", "to make booty / extract spoils of war". This version is criticised as well.

See also 
 Sclaveni
 Sporoi
 Nemets, Niemcy

References

Further reading 
 
 
 
 
 
 
 

Ethnonyms
Slavic history
Early Slavs
Slav